Egea or EGEA may refer to:

Biology
Egea inermis, a species of glass squid
Liarea egea, a species of land snail
Polygonia egea, a species of butterfly
Egea, a synonym of the moth genus Phyllometra

Other
European Geography Association, a European network of geography students and young geographers
Expert Group on Emergency Access, an expert group assisting in 112 emergency number access
Fiat Egea, a vehicle produced by Fiat for the Turkish market 
Teodoro García Egea, Spanish politician

See also
Ejea